Dystrophic calcinosis cutis is a cutaneous condition characterized by calcification of the skin resulting from the deposition of calcium and phosphorus, and occurs in a preexisting skin lesion of inflammatory process.

See also 
 Calcinosis cutis
 List of cutaneous conditions

References 

Skin conditions resulting from errors in metabolism